Adam Berner (born 25 January 1987) is a Swedish former footballer.

References

External links 
 

1987 births
Living people
Swedish footballers
Association football forwards
Mjällby AIF players
Kristianstad FC players
Allsvenskan players
Superettan players
Ettan Fotboll players